Vaujany is a commune in the canton of Oisans-Romanche, in the Isère department in southeastern France. The village is picturesque, with excellent views of the Grand Galbert mountain at the head of the valley.

Population

Economy
The hydroelectric dams of Grand'Maison (completed 1985) and Verney pay Vaujany annual rents of just over 3 million euros. This money has enabled the commune to fund the continuing development of leisure facilities. Vaujany is linked by cable car and gondola lift to the Alpe d'Huez ski area, so Vaujany benefits from winter sport and summer mountain tourism. Two runs drop down into the valley from the ski area above, and a short connecting lift from each run takes skiers to the village.

Grande Boucle Féminine stage finishes
Vaujany has been a frequent mountain-top finish in the Grande Boucle Féminine bicycle race (the equivalent of the Tour de France for female riders). It has been used on 13 occasions – every year from 1992 to 2003, and again in 2005.

Cable car accident
During a test run of a new cable car (which was to be the largest and fastest in the world), one week before its expected opening date on 13 January 1989, the cable car fell  into the valley below while the cabin was passing a point  from the arrival station. There were eight technicians on board the lift, all of whom died. They had all worked for SATA (the lift operator) or Poma (the lift builder). An expert witness at the trial claimed that the design was a poor-quality copy of a Swiss system, leading to design problems which rendered the operation of the cable car unsafe. Poma did not have much experience building this style of lift at the time and had agreed to complete the construction in ten months, compared to the two years proposed by some of its rivals, leading to claims that corners had been cut in the construction of the lift. The consulting engineer (Denis Creissels) also suggested that there was a lack of communication between the companies. On 9 September 1996 five people were charged with manslaughter at the criminal court of Grenoble; these were Jean-Pierre Cathiard (CEO of Poma), Serge Tarassof (technical director), Reylans Michel (engineer), Denis Creissels (supervisor) and Jacques Lombard (chief engineer). As part of the trial, four experts highlighted many mistakes made by Poma, most of which were based on the stabilizer, which had been copied from another company before having further issues added to its design.

See also
Communes of the Isère department

References

External links
 Official site
 Vaujany tourist office

Communes of Isère
Isère communes articles needing translation from French Wikipedia